Audubon Canyon Ranch (ACR) is a 501(c)(3) not-for-profit environmental conservation and education organization headquartered in Stinson Beach, Marin County, California, on the eastern shore of Bolinas Lagoon. The lands upon which ACR operates are within the ancestral territories of the Coast Miwok, Southern Pomo and Wappo peoples. ACR recognizes that Indigenous communities are very much alive today and striving to protect and maintain relationships with cultural and natural resources on ACR lands; they acknowledge that Indigenous lands are occupied by them and others.
 
Audubon Canyon Ranch was founded in 1962 to save a major heronry and block commercial development of Bolinas Lagoon in western Marin County, leading the way for the protection of Tomales Bay to the north.
 
ACR's conservation science program has monitored the North Bay region nesting successes of herons and egrets for over 40 years, collected long-term data sets on wintering shorebird and waterbird populations on Tomales Bay for over 30 years, and is using GPS to track the movements of individual mountain lions in the Sonoma Valley and Great Egrets and Long-billed Curlews on the coast. ACR's experiential nature education program, which turned 50 in 2020, has connected more than 300,000 Bay Area children and adults to the wonders of nature, cultivating environmental literacy and a conservation ethic. ACR's Fire Forward program, founded in 2017, is advancing our community's ability to use "good fire" to reduce risk and build ecosystem resilience against climate-driven wildfire events. ACR also stewards cultural treasures, including the literary legacy of American author M.F.K. Fisher at her last house at Bouverie Preserve.

Martin Griffin Preserve

The Martin Griffin Preserve encompasses  in West Marin, protected in perpetuity since 1962 as a wildlife sanctuary. The topography is characterized by its four canyons—Volunteer Canyon, Picher Canyon, Garden Club Canyon and Pike County Gulch—which vary in maximum elevation from 1,590 to 1,720 feet, and their associated streams and watersheds.

At the Bolinas Lagoon edge, California State Route 1 borders the western edge of the property while the Golden Gate National Recreation Area surrounds the northern, eastern and southern borders.

The Land

Mixed evergreen forests blanket slopes overlooking the Bolinas Lagoon. Open hillsides support grasslands and coastal scrub, while freshwater habitats nestle in canyon floors. The preserve is home to more than twenty-five species of mammals, over ninety species of land birds, thirteen species of reptile, and eight species of amphibian.

The preserve's frontage along Bolinas Lagoon brings more than 60 species of waterbirds and shorebirds into view—from sandpipers to osprey to pelicans—as well as some of the resident harbor seals.

The History

Operating for many years as a family-run dairy ranch called Canyon Ranch, the land is now protected in perpetuity thanks to the conservation efforts in the early 1960s of L. Martin Griffin (then president of the Marin Chapter of the National Audubon Society), Aileen Pierson, Stan Picher, and other dedicated volunteers who organized to purchase the property for the protection of heron and egret nesting sites. The preserve was designated a National Natural Landmark in 1968.
 
For over 40 years, the Martin Griffin Preserve was known as the Bolinas Lagoon Preserve of Audubon Canyon Ranch. In July 2010, the ACR Board of Directors formally renamed the preserve the Martin Griffin Preserve in honor of Marty Griffin's lifelong commitment to the environment and in recognition of the critical role he played in permanently protecting this section of the Marin County coastline.

See also
Golden Gate Biosphere Reserve
Bolinas Ridge
Pike County Gulch
M.F.K. Fisher

References

External links

Nature reserves in California
Canyons and gorges of California
Valleys of Marin County, California
West Marin
National Natural Landmarks in California
Protected areas of Marin County, California
Audubon movement
Protected areas established in 1968
1968 establishments in California
Non-profit organizations based in California
Environmental organizations based in California